The Heinkel HD 34 was a reconnaissance bomber built in Germany in the late 1920s.

Design and development
The HD 34 was a twin-engine biplane designed for long-range reconnaissance. The center section had a front cockpit with side-by-side seating, with the third crewmember in the rear cockpit.

On June 26, 1928, the HD.34 suffered damage on a test flight after losing control. It was decided, however, not to repair the aircraft due to high costs of repair.

Specifications

References

1920s German military reconnaissance aircraft
HD 34
Biplanes
Aircraft first flown in 1928
Twin piston-engined tractor aircraft